Eric Brock (born April 4, 1985) is a former American football safety who played for two seasons for the Atlanta Falcons of the National Football League (NFL). After playing college football for the Auburn Tigers, he was signed by the Falcons as an undrafted free agent in 2008.

Professional career
Brock was promoted to the Atlanta Falcons' active roster on December 22, 2009, after safety Antoine Harris was placed on injured reserve. Brock was waived on February 9, 2010.  Brock re-signed with the team on August 17, 2010, but was released prior to the 2010 season on September 4, 2010.

Coaching career
Brock became an assistant coach for the West Virginia Wesleyan College football team in July 2011. He was promoted to defensive coordinator on January 22, 2012.

References

External links
 Auburn Tigers bio

1985 births
Living people
American football safeties
Atlanta Falcons players
Auburn Tigers football players
People from Alexander City, Alabama
Players of American football from Alabama
West Virginia Wesleyan Bobcats football coaches